General elections were held in the Netherlands Antilles on 4 June 1962. 

The 22 seats in the Estates of the Netherlands Antilles consisted of twelve for Curaçao, eight for Aruba, one for Bonaire and one for the SSS Islands.

Results

Curaçao 
Population: 127,164 (31 December 1961)
Valid votes: 45,870
Seats: 12
Average valid votes per seat: 3,822.5

 National People's Party (NVP) / COP: 22,526 (7)
 Democratic Party: 18,953 (5)
 Constructive People's Party: 2,529 (0)
 Radical People's Party: 1,259 (0)
 Curaçaoan People's Union: 603 (0)

Members of the Estates of the Netherlands Antilles for Curaçao:
 S.D. Abbad
 J.A.O. Bikker
 W. de Boer, in 1964 succeeded by G.E.A. Booi
 H.L. Braam, in 1964 succeeded by P.A. van der Veen
 C.C. Campman-Zielinski
 C.E. Cathalina, in 1965 succeeded by R. Elhage
 M.F. da Costa Gomez, in 1963 succeeded by A.F.M. Torres
 C.H.W. Hueck
 H.G.M. Pieters Kwiers, in 1964 succeeded by Chr. van der Mark
 B.Ph. Römer
 L.C. van der Linde-Helmijr
 Ch.E.W. Voges

Aruba 
Population: 57,347 (31 December 1961)
Valid votes: 19,091
Seats: 8
Average valid votes per seat: 2,386.375

 Aruban Patriotic Party: 10,613 (5)
 Aruban People's Party: 6,289 (3)
 Aruban People's Union: 1,488 (0)
 Aruban Labour Front: 372 (0)
 Windward Island's Progressive Party: 329 (0)

Members of the Estates of the Netherlands Antilles for Aruba:
 D.G. Croes 
 M. Croes
 O. Croes
 C.A. Eman
 J. Erasmus
 E.R. Finck
 M. Henriquez
 D.C. Mathew, in 1964 succeeded by J. Geerman

Bonaire 
Population: 5,896 (31 December 1961)
Valid votes: 2,574
Seats: 1

 Bonaire Democratic Party: 1,453 (1; L.A. Abraham)
 United Progressive Bonairean Party: 1,121 (0)

SSS Islands 
Population: 4,985 (31 December 1961, Sint Maarten: 2,928; Sint Eustatius: 1,044; Saba: 1,013)
Valid votes: 1,640
Seats: 1

Aftermath 
On 2 November 1962 the Third Jonckheer cabinet was formed.

References 
 Algemeen Handelsblad, 5 June 1962
 Know Your Political History: St. Maarten, Saba, St. Eustatius, by Edgar Lynch & Julian Lynch, Election Watchnite Association, 1990, page 28 & 57

Elections in the Netherlands Antilles
Netherlands Antilles